Two destroyers of the Imperial Japanese Navy were named Uzuki:

 , a  launched in 1906 and stricken in 1925
 , a  launched in 1925 and sunk in 1944

Imperial Japanese Navy ship names
Japanese Navy ship names